The following is a list of awards and nominations received by Seinfeld, an American sitcom. The series has received 10 Emmy awards, 3 Golden Globes, and many other awards.

Awards and nominations

Golden Globe Awards 
Seinfeld won three Golden Globes in 1994.

Primetime Emmy Awards
Seinfeld has won 10 Primetime Emmy Awards, but has been nominated for 68 Emmys.

Cast nominations by season
Seinfeld was nominated for Outstanding Lead Actor in a Comedy Series five times, with zero wins. Louis-Dreyfus was nominated for Outstanding Supporting Actress in a Comedy Series seven times, with one win. Richards was nominated for Outstanding Supporting Actor in a Comedy Series five times, with three wins. Alexander was nominated for Outstanding Supporting Actor in a Comedy Series seven times, with zero wins.

Screen Actors Guild Awards

Directors Guild of America Awards 
Seinfeld has won three Directors Guild of America Awards for "Outstanding Directorial Achievement in Comedy Series" in which Tom Cherones won one and Andy Ackerman won two awards.

Writers Guild of America Awards 
Seinfeld has won four Writers Guild of America Awards.

ASCAP Film & Television Awards 
The Top TV Series Category, honors ASCAP composers who have written the themes and underscore for the highest rated series during the period of January 1 – December 31. Composer Jonathan Wolff has won 6 awards in Top TV series category, from 1994 to 1999.

ACE Eddie Awards

British Comedy Awards

People's Choice Awards
Seinfeld has won four People's Choice Awards from 1996 - 1998. In 1999 it was tied with Frasier.

References
General
Golden Globe Awards for Seinfeld goldenglobes.com. Retrieved on May 15, 2008
Emmy Awards official site "Seinfeld" "1990 - 1998" emmys.org. Retrieved on March 14, 2008

Notes

External links
Official website of Seinfeld
Primetime Emmy awards website
Official Primetime Emmys Award History Search
Golden Globe awards website
Screen Actors Guild website

Awards
Seinfeld